The Campur Formation (Kca) is a geologic formation of the Petén Basin of northern Guatemala. The subtidal limestone preserves fossils dating back to the Late Cretaceous period.

Description 
The formation consists of fossiliferous limestones with minor levels of dolomites. The formation is rich in rudists and miliolids. Breccias and clayey conglomerates, siltstones and limestones occur in the formation. The formation was probably deposited in a fore-reef environment in an open shelf system. The lower boundary of the Campur Formation is transitional into the underlying Cobán Formation. The formation is overlain by the Sepur Formation of the Petén Group. The Campur Formation is laterally equivalent with the upper part of the Ixcoy Formation of western Guatemala.

Fossil content 
The following fossils have been uncovered from the formation:
 Accordiella cf. conica
 Bournonia cardenasensis, B. excavata
 Distefanella lombricalis
 Senalveolina aubouini
 Sulcoperculina sp.

See also 
 List of fossiliferous stratigraphic units in Guatemala

References

Bibliography 
 
 

Geology of Guatemala
Cretaceous Guatemala
Limestone formations
Dolomite formations
Conglomerate formations
Shallow marine deposits
Formations
Formations